Siniša Kovačević (Serbian Cyrillic: Синиша Ковачевић, ; born 30 May 1954) is a Serbian author, playwright, politician and professor of the Belgrade Academy of Arts.

Biography
Kovačević was born on 30 May 1954 in the northern Serbian village of Šuljam. He graduated dramaturgy at the Faculty of Dramatic Arts in Belgrade. He is a professor on Academy of Arts in the case dramaturgy. He writes for theater, film, and TV. His works have been translated into Russian, Macedonian, English, and German language. He is married to actress Ljiljana Blagojević, with whom he has a daughter, Kalina Kovačević, also an actress. He lives and works in Belgrade.

Works

Stage dramas
 Đeneral Milan Nedić
 Novo je doba
 Sveti Sava
 Poslednja ruka pred fajront
 Srpska drama
 Virus
 Velika drama
 Kraljević Marko
 Janez
 Ravi
 Zečiji nasip
 Čudesni

TV dramas
 Portret Ilije Pevca
 Mala šala
 Svečana obaveza

Film scripts
 Država Mrtvih
 Bolje od bekstva
 Najbolji
 Najviše na svetu celom

Directed Premieres of his dramas
 Virus
 Kraljević Marko
 Janez
 Velika drama
 Zečiji nasip

Plus the movie Sinovci in 2006, and the TV series Gorki Plodovi in 2008/09.

Awards
 Triple Sterija Award winner for theatrical plays: Novo je doba, Đeneral Milan Nedić, Janez.
 Triple "Branislav Nušić" Award winner for theatrical plays: Sveti Sava, Kraljević Marko,Ravi.
 TV drama Novo je doba included in the top ten TV dramas, as the third.
 TV drama Svečana obaveza classified in the five best TV dramas ever recorded.
 TV drama Mala šala joke is included in četrvrtu book anthology of contemporary TV dramas.

References

External links 
 
 Interview with Siniša Kovačevic with biography and list of works and awards on Radio-Television of Serbia (in Serbian)

1954 births
Living people
People from Sremska Mitrovica
Serbian dramatists and playwrights
Serbian screenwriters
Male screenwriters
Serbian film directors
Serbian theatre directors
University of Belgrade Faculty of Dramatic Arts alumni
Theatre people from Belgrade